Alton Football Club is a football club based in Alton, Hampshire, England.

History

Alton Town
Alton Town Football Club was established in 1947. The club joined Division Three East of the Hampshire League and won the division in their first season, earning promotion to Division Two. They were Division Two champions the following season, as well as winning the Hampshire Intermediate Cup and the Russell Cotes Cup, resulting in promotion to Division One. The 1950–51 season saw them finish as runners-up in Division One. Although they were relegated at the end of the 1953–54 season, the club were Division Two champions the following season, earning an immediate promotion back to Division One. They were Division One runners-up in 1956–57 and league champions in 1957–58.

Alton were Division One runners-up again in 1962–63. In 1972–73 the club reached the first round of the FA Cup for the first time, losing 5–1 at Fourth Division Newport County. At the end of the season they left the Hampshire League to join Division Two of the Athenian League. After winning Division Two at the first attempt, there were promoted to Division One. The league was reduced to a single division in 1977, and after finishing bottom of the league in 1980–81, the club switched to the expanded Combined Counties League, where they were placed in the Western Division. They were Western Division runners-up in 1981–82 and the following season the league reverted to a single division.

After finishing second-from-bottom of the Combined Counties League in 1983–84, Alton dropped into Division Three of the Hampshire League. They finished bottom of the division for the next two seasons, but after it was disbanded in 1986 they were moved up to Division Two. They went on to win the Division Two title in 1986–87 and were promoted to Division One. In 1989–90 they were Division One runners-up.

Season-by-season

Merged club
In 1991 Alton Town merged with fellow Hampshire League Division One club Bass Alton. The new club was initially known as Alton Town Bass, before becoming Bass Alton Town the following season. In 1998 they were renamed Alton Town, and were Division One champions in 1998–99. Division One was renamed the Premier Division at the end of the season and Alton were Premier Division champions in 2001–02, earning promotion to the Wessex League. When the league gained a second division in 2004 they were placed in Division One, which was renamed the Premier Division in 2006.

Alton were transferred to the Premier Division of the Combined Counties League in 2013, but finished in the relegation zone in their first season in the division, resulting in relegation to Division One. In 2015 they were transferred back to the Wessex League, rejoining Division One. They were renamed Alton Football Club in 2016. In 2021 the club were promoted to the Premier Division based on their results in the abandoned 2019–20 and 2020–21 seasons.

Season-by-season

Ground
The club play at Anstey Park, which was the home ground of the original Alton Town club. The merged club played at the Bass Ground before moving to Anstey Park in 2015 as its owners, Coors Brewers, sought to use the site for redevelopment. Coors funded a refurbishment of the Anstey Road ground, which included a new grandstand (replacing an older one), new floodlights and an artificial pitch. A new covered stand was opened in 2017, replacing one that had been removed during the redevelopment work.

Honours
Athenian League
Division One champions 1973–74
Hampshire League
Champions 1957–58, 1998–99, 2001–02
Division Two champions 1948–49, 1954–55, 1986–87
Division Three East champions 1947–48
Hampshire Senior Cup
Winners 1957–88, 1968–69, 1971–72, 1977–78
Hampshire Intermediate Cup
Winners 1948–49
Russell Cotes Cup
Winners 1948–49

Records
Best FA Cup performance: First round, 1972–73
Best FA Amateur Cup performance: Quarter-finals, 1962–63
Best FA Trophy performance: Second qualifying round, 1976–77
Best FA Vase performance: Third round, 1978–79

See also
Alton F.C. players
Alton F.C. managers

References

External links
Official website

 
Football clubs in England
Football clubs in Hampshire
1991 establishments in England
Association football clubs established in 1991
Alton, Hampshire
Hampshire League
Athenian League
Combined Counties Football League
Wessex Football League